Asaphodes limonodes is a species of moth in the family Geometridae. It is endemic to New Zealand and is found in both the North and South Islands. This species inhabits damp native forest. Adults are on the wing from November until March.

Taxonomy

This species was described by Edward Meyrick in 1888 as Epyaxa limonodes using material collected by George Hudson in Wellington. Hudson discussed and illustrated this species in 1898 as Xanthorhoe limonodes. He also discussed and illustrated this moth under this same name in his 1928 book The Butterflies and Moths of New Zealand. In 1939 Louis Beethoven Prout placed this species in the genus Larentia.   This placement was not accepted by New Zealand taxonomists. In 1971 J. S. Dugdale placed this species within the genus Asaphodes. In 1988 Dugdale confirmed this placement. The lectotype specimen is held at the Natural History Museum, London.

Description
Meyrick described the species as follows:

Distribution
This species is endemic to New Zealand. This species has been found in both the North and South Islands at Waimarino, Ohakune, Mount Taranaki, Wellington, Buller River, Otira, Poherua and Lake Wakatipu.

Biology and life cycle
This species is on the wing from November until March.

Habitat and host plant
A. limonodes prefers damp forest habitat.

References

Larentiinae
Moths described in 1888
Moths of New Zealand
Endemic fauna of New Zealand
Taxa named by Edward Meyrick
Endemic moths of New Zealand